Agop Batu Tulug Caves is an archaeological site in the Malaysian state of Sabah and refers to a group of several caves in a steep limestone cliffs in the Kinabatangan district.

Etymology 
The name combines words from three languages: agop in Sungai language means "cave", batu is the Malay word for "rock", while  comes from the Cebuano language (carrying the same meaning as in the Sungai language) where it means "to go to sleep" referring to the resting place of the dead.

History 

The caves were used 500 to 900 years ago as a burial place with about 125 carved wooden coffins inside. It was divided into three main caves, namely Agop Sawat (upper cave), Agop Lintanga (middle cave) and Agop Suriba (lower cave). The caves at Agop Sawat and Lintanga contained more than 125 ancient log coffins. All coffins inside the caves were made from belian (Eusideroxylon zwageri) hardwood, and decorated with carvings of buffalo head, crocodile, house lizard and snake.

The carvings reflect the myths and legends of the Kinabatangan people. For example, a crocodile is related to death and the power darkness while the bugang bird, dog, rooster and deer were friends of their heroes. The coffins resemble different animals associated to the beliefs of the Orang Sungai but it has also been said that they are the coffins of the Chinese who once settled in the area as Chinese artefacts were found among the remains.

It is believed that this type of funeral culture was brought by traders from Mainland China and Indochina to northern Borneo, since similar wooden coffins were also discovered in these countries. Researchers assumes that about 2,000 such wooden coffins are distributed in the Kinabatangan Valley. Other sites are located in Ulu Segama, Lahad Datu and Tawau.

The cave was discovered in 1984 through an expedition led by P Brietag, the manager of tobacco estate in Batu Putih of Kinabatangan together with researcher Barbara Harrisson of Sarawak State Museum and staffs of the Sabah Museum. Since 6 July 1996, the caves are part of the Sabah Museum, which is responsible for maintenance and upkeep the ancillary facilities such as toilets, staircase buildings, office buildings and overnight cabins except for the scientific support of the caves.

References

External links 

 Batu Tulug Museum on etawau.com

Archaeological sites in Malaysia
Caves of Malaysia
Landforms of Sabah
Limestone caves
Monuments and memorials in Malaysia
Tourist attractions in Sabah
Museums in Sabah